Hansca is a village in Ialoveni District, Moldova.

Demographics
According to the 2004 census, the village population is 1080 people, 49.91% are male and 50.09% female.

References

Villages of Ialoveni District